Mount Zion is a city in Carroll County, Georgia, United States. The population was 1,696 at the 2010 census.

History
The City of Mount Zion was established in 1852 by Reverend Thomas Hicks Martin (March 10, 1822 - June 14, 1914), after his family had settled on land that had once been owned by the Creek Confederacy. It became known as Turkey Creek Mills, the name derived from a large wild turkey population found in the area. The city's name was later adopted from the local Mount Zion Methodist Episcopal Church, established 1865, which had soon became the center point of the community, and in 1878 the name Turkey Creek Mills was changed to Mount Zion.

In 1877, Reverend James Mitchell took his ministry to Mount Zion and founded the Mount Zion Seminary, the predecessor institution of the current Mount Zion High School.

The Georgia General Assembly incorporated Mount Zion as a town in 1912 and  re-chartered in 1953 and again in 1978.

Mount Zion is one of the few cities in Georgia with the Confederate Flag incorporated in its city flag, which is based on the 1956 Georgia state flag and inspired by the Trenton, Georgia city flag that began flying in 2002. The Mount Zion city flag began flying April 10, 2007.

Geography

Mount Zion is located in northern Carroll County at  (33.631113, -85.179868). John Tanner Park is just south of the city limits off of Highway 16.

Demographics

As of the census of 2000, there were 1,275 people, 434 households, and 351 families residing in the city. The racial makeup of the city was 94.12% White, 3.76% African American, 0.24% Native American, 0.94% Asian, 0.24% from other races, and 0.71% from two or more races. Hispanic or Latino of any race were 0.31% of the population.

There were 434 households, out of which 44.5% had children under the age of 18 living with them, 63.6% were married couples living together, 13.1% had a female householder with no husband present, and 18.9% were non-families. 15.7% of all households were made up of individuals, and 6.5% had someone living alone who was 65 years of age or older.  The average household size was 2.94 and the average family size was 3.27.

In the city, the population was spread out, with 31.3% under the age of 18, 8.2% from 18 to 24, 34.4% from 25 to 44, 19.3% from 45 to 64, and 6.8% who were 65 years of age or older.  The median age was 31 years. For every 100 females, there were 107.0 males.  For every 100 females age 18 and over, there were 96.9 males.

The median income for a household in the city was $41,912, and the median income for a family was $43,438. Males had a median income of $31,959 versus $20,662 for females. The per capita income for the city was $16,080.  About 11.8% of families and 12.9% of the population were below the poverty line, including 15.8% of those under age 18 and 22.6% of those age 65 or over.

Notable people
Walter Terry Colquitt, Methodist preacher, United States Representative and Senator from Georgia
James Mitchell, U.S. Commissioner of negro colonization for President Abraham Lincoln

References

External links
City of Mount Zion official website

Cities in Georgia (U.S. state)
Cities in Carroll County, Georgia